Anton Demchenko (born 20 August 1987) is a Russian chess grandmaster. He competed in the FIDE World Cup in 2017.

Career
Demchenko won the PSC/Puregold International Chess Challenge in Quezon City in 2014, the ZMDI Open in Dresden in 2016, the 47th International Tournament Bosna (pl) in Sarajevo in 2017 and the European Individual Chess Championship in Reykjavik in 2021.

Together with 43 other Russian elite chess players, Demchenko signed an open letter to Russian president Vladimir Putin, protesting against the 2022 Russian invasion of Ukraine and expressing solidarity with the  Ukrainian people.

References

External links

Anton Demchenko chess games at 365Chess.com

Interview by Chess.com

1987 births
Living people
Chess grandmasters
Russian chess players
Place of birth missing (living people)